At the 2013 Southeast Asian Games, the athletics events took place in Naypyidaw, Myanmar. The track and field events took place at the Wunna Theikdi Stadium. The competition held between December 15–19.

Thailand retained its traditional position as the nation with the most gold medals with seventeen among its 39 medals. Vietnam was comfortably the next strongest performer with ten golds in its 33-medal haul. Indonesia was third with six gold medals and a total of seventeen. The Philippines also won six golds, and its total of 13 medals was matched by Malaysia and the hosts Myanmar. Eight of the eleven participating countries reached the medal table.

A total of eight games records were bettered at the competition. Thailand provided the bulk of these performances with Jamras Rittidet (men's 110 m hurdles), Tantipong Phetchaiya (men's hammer), Peerachet Jantra (men's javelin), Sukanya Chomchuendee (women's pole vault) and Subenrat Insaeng (women's discus throw) adding themselves to the record books. Myanmar's Saw Mar Lar Nwe significantly improved her best by winning the women's 20 km walk in 1:35:03 hours – breaking the games record and improving the Burmese record by nearly seven minutes.

Several athletes won multiple individual titles. Jirapong Meenapra did the men's short sprint double, Mohd Jironi Riduan took gold in both men's middle-distance running events and Nguyen Van Lai broke Vietnamese records to claim a 5000 metres/10,000 metres double. On the women's side, Vu Thi Huong won the sprints and her compatriot Do Thi Thao did a middle-distance double for Vietnam. Phyu War Thet and Triyaningsih had a gold and silver each from the long-distance track events. Maria Natalia Londa won both horizontal jumps and multi-eventer Wassana Winatho won both the heptathlon and the 400 metres hurdles, which brought her career SEA Games medal count to 13.

Medalists

Men

Women

Medal table

References